Tramatza is a comune (municipality) in the Province of Oristano in the Italian region Sardinia, located about  northwest of Cagliari and about  northeast of Oristano.

Tramatza borders the following municipalities: Bauladu, Milis, San Vero Milis, Siamaggiore, Solarussa, Zeddiani.

Demographic evolution

References

Cities and towns in Sardinia